Arne Andersen may refer to:

Arne Andersen (handballer) (born 1944), Danish handballer
Arne Andersen (footballer) (1900–1986), Norwegian international footballer

See also 
Arne Andersson (1917–2009), Swedish athlete
Arn Anderson (born 1958), former American professional wrestler and author